Kirari may refer to:

People with the given name
 Kirari (singer) (born 1980), Japanese singer
, Japanese women's professional shogi player

Places
 Kirari (Delhi Assembly constituency)
 Kirari Suleman Nagar

Music
 Kirari (album), a 2011 album by Dazzle Vision
 "Kirari" (Dazzle Vision song), a song by Dazzle Vision
 "Kirari" (Fujii Kaze song), a song by Fujii Kaze
 Best Kirari, is a greatest hits album of the character Kirari Tsukishima 
 Kirari to Fuyu, is the third studio album of the character Kirari Tsukishima

Other uses
 OICETS or Kirari, an experimental satellite

Japanese feminine given names